Frailea chiquitana is a species of Frailea from Bolivia.

References

External links
 
 

chiquitana
Cacti of South America
Endemic flora of Bolivia